Slovenia competed at the 1994 Winter Olympics in Lillehammer, Norway.

Medalists

Alpine skiing

Men

Men's combined

Women

Women's combined

Biathlon

Men

Men's 4 × 7.5 km relay

Women

 1 A penalty loop of 150 metres had to be skied per missed target.
 2 One minute added per missed target.

Ski jumping 

Men's team large hill

 1 Four teams members performed two jumps each.

References

 Official Olympic Reports
 International Olympic Committee results database
 Olympic Winter Games 1994, full results by sports-reference.com

Nations at the 1994 Winter Olympics
Winter Olympics
1994 Winter Olympics